The Sheep is a character, created by Charles Lutwidge Dodgson, a.k.a. Lewis Carroll.  It appeared in Dodgson's 1871 book, Through the Looking-Glass, the sequel to his 1865 book Alice's Adventures in Wonderland.

Storyline 
The Sheep is first mentioned in the fifth chapter of Through the Looking-Glass, "Wool and Water". The White Queen is talking to Alice, when she suddenly starts "baa-ing" and then seems to 'wrap herself in wool'. Alice figures out she is in a shop, and that The White Queen has turned into a sheep. The Sheep sits in her chair knitting as Alice looks around the shop. She gives Alice a pair of her knitting needles, and asks her if she can row. As Alice begins to answer, she realizes that they are in a little boat, and that the needles have turned into oars. As they glide along the water, the Sheep repeatedly shouts out "Feather", which means to lift the oar blades out of the water, turn them to a horizontal plane and swing them toward the bow so they don't get 'caught' in the water.  The sheep then tells Alice that they will be catching 'crabs' (which is rowing terminology for getting one's blades stuck in the water if one fails to feather properly). Alice's attention is then put onto some scented rushes growing in the water. She tries picking them, but they are only 'dream rushes' and melt away. She then "catches a crab" and they are all suddenly in the shop again. Alice buys an egg from the Sheep (that ends up turning into Humpty Dumpty) and the two part ways.

References 

Fictional sheep
Lewis Carroll characters
Literary characters introduced in 1871